Sandeep Kumar may refer to:

Sandeep Kumar (archer), Indian archer
Sandeep Kumar (politician) (born 1980), Indian minister in Delhi government
Sandeep Kumar (racer) (born 1992), Indian race car driver
Sandeep Kumar (racewalker) (born 1986), Indian racewalker
Sandeep Kumar (rower) (born 1988), Indian rower
Sandeep Kumar (weightlifter) (born 1975), Indian weightlifter
Sandeep Kumar (wrestler) (born 1983), Indian wrestler